Sanad Rashed (also Romanized as Sanad Rāshed; also known as Seyyed Rāshed) is a village in Jazireh-ye Minu Rural District, Minu District, Khorramshahr County, Khuzestan Province, Iran. At the 2006 census, its population was 173, in 34 families.

References 

Populated places in Khorramshahr County